In Ovid's Metamorphoses, Phobetor ('Frightener'), so called by men, or Icelos ('Like'), so called by the gods, is one of the thousand sons of Somnus (Sleep). He appeared in dreams "in the form of beast or bird or the long serpent".

According to Ovid, two of his brothers were Morpheus, who appeared in dreams in human form, and Phantasos  ('Fantasy'), who appears in dreams in the form of inanimate objects. The three brothers‘ names are found nowhere earlier than Ovid, and are perhaps Ovidian inventions. Tripp calls these three figures "literary, not mythical concepts". However, Griffin suggests that this division of dream forms between Phobetor and his brothers, possibly including their names, may have been of Hellenistic origin.

See also
Epiales
Melinoë

Notes

References
 .
 Ovid. Metamorphoses, Volume II: Books 9-15. Translated by Frank Justus Miller. Revised by G. P. Goold. Loeb Classical Library No. 43. Cambridge, Massachusetts: Harvard University Press, 1916. Online version at Harvard University Press.
 Tripp, Edward, Crowell's Handbook of Classical Mythology, Thomas Y. Crowell Co; First edition (June 1970). .

Fictional characters with dream manipulation abilities